Shaykh Manṣūr Ibn Yūnus Al-Buhūtī (c. 1592 – July 1641), better known as al-Buhūtī, was an Egyptian Islamic theologian and jurist. He espoused the Hanbali school of Islam and is widely considered to be the final editor and commentator (Khātam-ul-Muḥaqqaqīn). His legal writings are considered well-researched and concise, and are still studied and highly revered in Hanbali circles in Saudi Arabia, Syria, Qatar, Kuwait, and Egypt. From his most notable works is al-Rawd Al Murbi’ Sharh Zād Al Mustaqni which is studied by intermediate students of Hanbali jurisprudence.

He also wrote commentaries on advanced works of jurisprudence, such as Sharh Al Muntahā, and Kashhaf al-Qina, as well as an abridged text for beginners entitled Umdat at-Talib.

He was born in Buhut, Egypt in 1591 and died in Cairo in July 1641, at the age of 51.

References

Hanbalis
17th-century Muslim scholars of Islam
Egyptian writers
Egyptian Sunni Muslims
1641 deaths
Year of birth uncertain